Blanchard Glacier is a glacier flowing into Wilhelmina Bay between Garnerin Point and Sadler Point, on the west coast of Graham Land. First charted by the Belgian Antarctic Expedition under Gerlache, 1897–99, it was named by the UK Antarctic Place-Names Committee in 1960 for Jean-Pierre Blanchard (1753–1809), French aeronaut, the first professional balloon pilot, who, with John Jeffries, made the first balloon crossing of the English Channel in 1785.

See also
 List of glaciers in the Antarctic
 Glaciology

References
 

Glaciers of Danco Coast